oCeLoT aka Aaron Peacock (born 1974 in San Francisco, California, United States) is an American record producer and DJ. He has been producing music since 1993 (featuring releases on Journees Music 1995 "Blue Spotted Frog" ep as Aaron Peacock) and has released material on Dropout Productions, Vertigo Records, Ceiba Records, Avatar Records, Insomnia Records, Zaikadelic Records, Ektoplazm.com, and many more. Featuring a discography of eight albums and more than 100 singles. He produces a Progressive Goa project called Prog-A-Lot, various Techno and House projects (Peacock, Aaron Peacock...), and Drum & Bass / Breaks as NeuroTransmitterz.

oCeLoT has toured over 55 countries and played on festivals like Boom, Ozora, Soulclipse, 303, Space of Joy, Full-Moon, Vuuv, and Transcendence.

External links
Official website
Discography

Official oCeLoT Facebook page

Interviews
June 2015 interview at Psytrance.pl
March 2007 interview at Caffix
Original interview in Spanish at Caffix Productions

Psychedelic trance musicians
American electronic musicians
Living people
1974 births
Remixers